Fabrice Daniel Hartmann (born 2 March 2001) is a German professional footballer who plays as a winger and forward for League of Ireland Premier Division club Sligo Rovers, on loan from RB Leipzig.

Club career

Germany
Hartmann made his professional debut for RB Leipzig on 26 July 2018, coming on as a substitute in the 89th minute for Matheus Cunha in the UEFA Europa League qualifying match against Swedish club BK Häcken of the Allsvenskan, which finished as a 4–0 home win.

On 28 January 2022, Hartmann was loaned to Eintracht Braunschweig until the end of the season.

Sligo Rovers loan
On 27 July 2022, he moved on loan to Sligo Rovers in Ireland. It was announced on 12 August 2022 that Hartmann would not be available to play for the club in 2022 due to an 'administrative error' which saw his registration miss the deadline. He scored the first goal of his senior career on 6 March 2023 when he scored the final goal in a 2–1 win at home to St Patrick's Athletic.

Career statistics

References

External links
 

2001 births
Living people
German footballers
Association football wingers
Germany youth international footballers
RB Leipzig players
SC Paderborn 07 players
Eintracht Braunschweig players
Sligo Rovers F.C. players
2. Bundesliga players
German expatriate footballers
Expatriate association footballers in the Republic of Ireland
German expatriate sportspeople in Ireland